Anatoma amoena is a species of sea snail, a marine gastropod mollusk in the family Anatomidae.

Description
The shell grows to a length of 3.5 mm.

Distribution
This species occurs in the Weddell Sea, Antarctica.

References

 Zelaya D.G. & Geiger D.L. (2007). Species of Scissurellidae and Anatomidae from Sub-Antarctic and Antarctic waters (Gastropopda: Vetigastropoda). Malacologia 49(2):393–443.
 Geiger D.L. & Marshall B.A. (2012) New species of Scissurellidae, Anatomidae, and Larocheidae (Mollusca: Gastropoda: Vetigastropoda) from New Zealand and beyond. Zootaxa 3344: 1–33

External links

Anatomidae
Gastropods described in 1912